Hoeryŏng is a city in North Hamgyong Province, North Korea. It is located opposite Jilin Province, China, with the Tumen River in between. Sanhe (三合鎮), in Longjing City, is the closest Chinese town across the river. Hoeryŏng is the birthplace of Kim Il Sung's first wife and Kim Jong Il's mother, Kim Jong Suk. The Hoeryong Revolutionary Site commemorates the birthplace.

History 
Hoeryŏng was one of the six posts/garrisons (Chosŏngŭl: 육진,  Hanja: 六鎭) established under the order of Sejong the Great of Joseon (1418 - 1450) to safeguard his people from the potentially hostile semi-nomadic Jurchens living north of the Yalu river.
In 1952, some territories of Hoeryŏng (then a county), which included myoen of Poŭl and parts of myoens of  Yonghung and Pyŏksŏng, were incorporated into the then newly created Yusŏn county. After the 1974 incorporation of Yusŏn county, the Yusŏn region became a up and was renamed as Yusŏn worker's region.
In early May 2007, the newly appointed Prime Minister Kim Yong-il visited Hoeryŏng. At the time, the Prime Minister brought with him on his train one carriage worth of glass (made in South Korea) and 3 carriages worth of cement. After delivering the goods to the People's Committee of Hoeryŏng he ordered that the city of Hoeryŏng be decorated and adorned as much as a city where Mother Kim Jong Suk's birthplace should be.

Administrative divisions
Hoeryŏng-si is divided into 19 tong (neighbourhoods) and 28 ri (villages):

Economy
Hoeryŏng's main industries are mining machines and a paper mill. The area contains many mines. According to media reports, in 2017 ordinary residents in Hoeryong receive electricity for 3–4 hours per day. However, many people do not have electricity at all.

Civil unrest
It is reported that on 24 September 2008 only about 20% of Hoeryŏng's city residents attended a civilian defence-training programme held in Hoeryŏng City. The other 80% are thought to have stayed home or tended to private patch fields. As punishment, authorities from the Civilian Defence ordered non-attendees to pay KP₩5,000, however this fine was largely ignored.

2016 Flood

On August 29, 2016, as the result of Typhoon Lionrock, the Tumen River flooded, making many of the residents homeless and causing substantial property damage. The displaced residents moved to China.

Climate
Hoeryong has a humid continental climate (Köppen climate classification: Dwb).

See also

List of cities in North Korea
Geography of North Korea

Notes

Further reading
Dormels, Rainer. North Korea's Cities: Industrial facilities, internal structures and typification. Jimoondang, 2014.

External links

Hoeryong City picture album at Naenara
Location of the four forts and the six posts
Hoeryong Hotel 회령려관 - the only hotel in Hoeryong that accommodates foreigners

Cities in North Hamgyong